The Richard J. Fox School of Business and Management is the business school of Temple University. Located in Philadelphia, the Fox School offers several Master of Business Administration programs (full-time MBA, part-time MBA, international MBA, executive MBA and online MBA); several other master's degree programs; and several Ph.D. programs, including in accountancy, finance, marketing, international business, entrepreneurship, management of information systems, risk management and insurance, strategic management, and sports. The school has some 6,500 students, 155 full-time faculty, and over 42,000 graduates, of which about two-thirds live and work in the Philadelphia metropolitan area. It is the largest business school in the Philadelphia region and one of the largest in the world.

Established in 1918, it was named in honor of Richard J. Fox in 1999. The MBA program began in 1942. The school has been accredited by the International Association for Management Education (now the Association to Advance Collegiate Schools of Business (AACSB)) since 1973. The PhD in Economics program was established in 1976.

Alter Hall 

The Fox School opened an $80 million, 200,000 square foot facility named Alter Hall in April 2009. The seven-story building was constructed using smart classroom design components and features a trading room and business simulation center, along with one of the longest stock tickers in the United States.

Notable alumni and faculty 

Cody Calafiore – actor, model
John Carrig - former COO and president for ConocoPhillips
Sam Greenblatt - vice president of technology and architecture in Enterprise Solution Group of Dell
Jai Gulati - CEO of Systel
Malgosia Majewska - Miss World Canada winner
Larry Miller - president of Jordan Brand, former president of Portland Trail Blazers
Zach Pfeffer (born 1995) - soccer player
Ash Vasudevan - founding Managing Partner of Edge Holdings

See also
List of United States business school rankings
List of business schools in the United States

References

External links 

Temple University
Business schools in Pennsylvania
Educational institutions established in 1918
Templetown, Philadelphia
New Classical architecture
1918 establishments in Pennsylvania